Beaver Valley may refer to the following places

Places
 Beaver Valley, Arizona, U.S.
 Beaver Valley, Delaware and Pennsylvania, U.S.
 Beaver Valley Estates, Alberta, Canada
 Beaver Valley Nuclear Power Station, near Shippingport, Pennsylvania, U.S.

Valleys
 Beaver Valley (Ontario), Canada
 Beaver Valley (Utah), U.S.

See also 

 Beaver River (Pennsylvania)